The sake bomb or sake bomber is a beer cocktail made by pouring sake into a shot glass and dropping it into a glass of beer.

Preparation 
Two chopsticks are placed parallel on top of the glass of beer, and the shot glass is placed on top of them. The drinker slams the table with their fists, causing the sake to fall into the beer. It should be drunk immediately. The drinker may count to three in Japanese, "ichi...ni...san...sake bomb!" Or they may simply yell "Kanpai!" The sake bomb chant may also be said before drinking. The chant has one person say "sake" and others say "bomb", before consuming the drink. Usually done with cold sake

A variation of the sake bomb is to "bomb" a shot of warm sake into a chilled Red Bull energy drink.

See also
 Beer cocktail
 Boilermaker
 Irish car bomb
 Jägerbomb
 Queen Mary (beer cocktail)
 Tamagozake

References

External links 
 

Cocktails with beer
Cocktails with sake
Shooters (drinks)